Wladimir Eliseo Herrera Maralicán (born 12 December 1981) is a former Chilean footballer.

He finished his career at Deportes Puerto Montt playing in Primera B.

Honours

Club
Ñublense
 Tercera División de Chile: 2004

External links
 
 

1981 births
Living people
Chilean footballers
Ñublense footballers
Cobresal footballers
Lota Schwager footballers
Audax Italiano footballers
Puerto Montt footballers
Deportes Copiapó footballers
Deportes Melipilla footballers
Chilean Primera División players
Primera B de Chile players
Association football defenders